In physics, Peek's law defines the electric potential gap necessary for triggering a corona discharge between two wires:

 

ev is the "visual critical corona voltage" or "corona inception voltage" (CIV), the voltage  required to initiate a visible corona discharge between the wires. It is named after Frank William Peek (1881–1933).

mv is an irregularity factor to account for the condition of the wires.  For smooth, polished wires, mv = 1.  For roughened, dirty or weathered wires, 0.98 to 0.93, and for cables, 0.87 to 0.83, namely the surface irregularities result in diminishing the corona threshold voltage. 

r is the radius of the wires in cm.

S is the distance between the center of the wires.

gv is the "visual critical" electric field, and is given by:

 

δ is the air density factor with respect to SATP (25°C and 76 cmHg):

 

g0 is the "disruptive electric field."

c is an empirical dimensional constant.

 The values for the last two parameters are usually considered to be about 30-32 kV/cm (in air) and 0.301 cm½ respectively. This latter law can be considered to hold also in different setups, where the corresponding voltage is different due to geometric reasons.

References 

 
 High Voltage Engineering Fundamentals, E.Kuffel and WS Zaengl, Pergamon Press, p366

Plasma physics